Chamaita nudarioides is a moth of the family Erebidae. It is found on the Bismarck Islands.

References

Nudariina
Moths described in 1882